The Gallotone Champion Guitar was an acoustic guitar manufactured in South Africa by the country's largest record company, Gallo Africa, during the 1950s and '60s. It was a cheaply made instrument intended for the beginner market and was exported to many countries.

The Champion model is a 3/4 size steel string flat-top acoustic made from laminated woods, and was  "guaranteed not to split".

Perhaps the most famous of all Gallotone Champion players was John Lennon, whose guitar was sold  for £155,500 ($251,700) at a "Rock'n'Roll" memorabilia sale by Sotheby's London in 1999. There is also a childhood photograph of Jimmy Page posed with a Gallotone Wonder.

References 

Acoustic guitars